Chip Chats is a bimonthly publication by the National Wood Carvers Association (NWCA). The magazine highlights individual art from every single state in the United States and various other countries. The magazine also offers local club information for wood carvers interested in local chapter details. The president of the NWCA chooses the editor-in-chief for the publication. Currently, the Editor-in-Chief is Ed Gallenstein, who also is the President of the NWCA. Ed has held this position since 1971.

Notes

External links
 Official website

1953 establishments in Ohio
Visual arts magazines published in the United States
Bimonthly magazines published in the United States
Magazines established in 1953
Magazines published in Cincinnati
Woodcarving